The First Security Bank is a low-rise building in the heart of Downtown Missoula, Montana. It is located at 100 East Broadway.

Purpose 
The purpose of this building is part of the Missoula Downtown Master Plan, that the Missoula Downtown association has created to redevelop Missoula's historic buildings and attract new construction to the downtown area.

See also 
Missoula, Montana

References 

Buildings and structures in Missoula, Montana